Circus 1903 is an American contemporary circus.

Circus 1903 originated as a touring show and in 2017 moved to the Paris Theater at the Paris Las Vegas hotel and casino.

References

External links

Circuses